The Kalamazoo Lassies were a team who played from  through  in the All-American Girls Professional Baseball League. The team represented Kalamazoo, Michigan. Home games were initially played at Lindstrom Field, but later games were played at the Catholic Athletic Association Field, now the Soisson-Rapacz field.  Kalamazoo uniforms were white (home) and gold (away) with dark green numbers, belt, socks, and cap.

History
In 1950 the AAGPBL was losing money and fans, and the teams and host cities were changing almost every year. This was a good thing for Kalamazoo as the city was granted the Muskegon Lassies team on a trial basis when the city of Muskegon could no longer support them. The move took place in the middle of the season and the new Kalamazoo Lassies played their first game, still in their Muskegon uniforms, on 15 June 1950 at Lindstrom Field. About 1,400 fans attended the game, which was won by the defending league champion Rockford Peaches, 8–2. The new Lassies posted their first victory the next night, a 10–2 rout of Rockford led by pitcher Doris Sams and player-manager Bonnie Baker. The Lassies combined for a 36–73 record that year and finished in the cellar.

The Lassies ended 1951 with a mark of 33 wins, 75 losses and two ties, but moved up one spot in the final standings. In 1952, the team finished fifth of six teams with a 49–60 record, their best yet. Kalamazoo improved in 1953, ending third at 59-50-2 and reaching the playoffs for the first time. After dropping the opener to the first-place Fort Wayne Daisies, Kalamazoo won 2–1 and 5–3 as Jean Lovell got a couple big hits. But the Lassies lost both games in the finals to the Grand Rapids Chicks.

In the 1954 season, the Lassies posted a 48-49-1 record and finished fourth of five teams, earning the right to go to the playoffs. In the first round, the team disposed of the South Bend Blue Sox in three games and faced the Fort Wayne Daisies for the Championship Title.

1954 champions

In Game 1 of the AAGPBL Series, Kalamazoo defeated Fort Wayne 17-9 behind a four-hit, seven strong innings from June Peppas, who also helped herself by hitting 2-for-4, including one home run. Her teammates Carol Habben and Fern Shollenberger also slugged one each, and Chris Ballingall belted a grand slam. Pitching star Maxine Kline, who had posted an 18–7 record with 3.23 ERA for the Daisies during the regular season, gave up 11 runs in six innings and was credited with the loss. Katie Horstman connected two home runs for the Daisies in a lost cause, and her teammate Joanne Weaver slugged one.

The Daisies bounced back in Game 2, hitting five home runs against the Lassies to win, 11–4. Horstman started the feat with a two-run home run to open the score in the first inning. In the rest of the game, Betty Weaver Foss added two homers and drove in five runs, while her sister Joanne and
In Game 4, starter Gloria Cordes helped Kalamazoo to tie the series, pitching a complete game victory over the Daisies, 6–5. Habben drove in two runs who marked the difference, while Kline suffered her second loss of the Series.

In decisive Game 5, Peppas pitched a clutch complete game and went 3-for-5 with an RBI against her former Daisies team, winning by an 8–5 margin to give the Lassies the Championship title in the AAGPBL's last game. She received support from Mary Taylor (5-for-5), Balingall (3-for-4) and Schroeder, who drove in the winning run in the bottom of the eight. Peppas finished with a .450 average in the Series and collected two of the three Lassies victories, to become the winning pitcher of the last game in the league's history.

All-time roster
Bold denotes members of the inaugural roster

Gertrude Alderfer
Agnes Allen
Isabel Alvarez
Ange Armato
Mary Baker
Chris Ballingall
Doris Barr
Mary Baumgartner
Donna Becker
Kay Blumetta
Mary Carey
Isora Castillo
Donna Chartier
Donna Cook
Doris Cook
Gloria Cordes
Betty Jane Cornett
Alice DeCambra
Lillian Faralla
Betty Francis
Carol Habben
Marlene Hammond
Jean Havlish
Alice Hohlmayer
Frances Janssen
Rita Keller
Barbara Liebrich
Jean Lovell
Betty Luna
Jean Marlowe
Mirtha Marrero
Naomi Meier
Miss DeMarco
Jane Moffet
Eleanor Moore
Nancy Mudge
Dorothy Naum
Miss Nogay
Anna Mae O'Dowd
Barbara Payne
Marguerite Pearson
June Peppas
Betty Jean Peterson
Charlene Pryer
Sara Reeser
Jenny Romatowski
Eilaine Roth
Elaine Roth
Terry Rukavina
Doris Sams
Joan Schatz
Dorothy Schroeder
Fern Shollenberger
Joan Sindelar
Joyce Steele
Jane Stoll
Mary Taylor
Helen Walulik
Nancy Warren
Margaret Wenzell
Betty Whiting
Ruth Williams

Managers

References

Sources
All-American Girls Professional Baseball League history
All-American Girls Professional Baseball League official website – Kalamazoo Lassies seasons
All-American Girls Professional Baseball League official website – Manager/Player profile search results
Kalamazoo Public Library
June Peppas: All-American Star
All-American Girls Professional Baseball League Record Book – W. C. Madden. Publisher: McFarland & Company, 2000. Format: Hardcover, 294pp. Language: English. 
The Women of the All-American Girls Professional Baseball League: A Biographical Dictionary – W. C. Madden. Publisher:  McFarland & Company, 2005. Format: Softcover, 295 pp. Language: English. 

All-American Girls Professional Baseball League teams
1950 establishments in Michigan
1954 disestablishments in Michigan
Baseball teams established in 1950
Baseball teams disestablished in 1954
Sports in Kalamazoo, Michigan
Defunct baseball teams in Michigan
Women's sports in Michigan